Moebelia is a genus of dwarf spiders that was first described by Friedrich Dahl in 1886.

Species
 it contains three species:
Moebelia berolinensis (Wunderlich, 1969) – Germany
Moebelia penicillata (Westring, 1851) (type) – Europe, Caucasus
Moebelia rectangula Song & Li, 2007 – China

See also
 List of Linyphiidae species (I–P)

References

Araneomorphae genera
Linyphiidae
Palearctic spiders
Spiders of China
Taxa named by Friedrich Dahl